Lanthanites are a group of isostructural rare earth element (REE) carbonate minerals. This group comprises the minerals lanthanite-(La), lanthanite-(Ce), and lanthanite-(Nd). This mineral group has the general chemical formula of (REE)2(CO3)3·8(H2O). Lanthanites include La, Ce, and Nd as major elements and often contain subordinate amounts of other REEs including praseodymium (Pr), samarium (Sm), europium (Eu) and dysprosium (Dy). The lanthanite crystal structure consists of layers of 10-fold coordinated REE-oxygen (O) polyhedra and carbonate (CO32−) groups connected by hydrogen bonds to interlayer water molecules, forming a highly hydrated structure.

Origin and formation

Lanthanites are frequently found as secondary minerals formed by the weathering of other minerals and occur as scales or tabular crystals. Originally identified at Bastnäs, Sweden, they have subsequently been found in New Zealand, Japan, Madagascar, Wales, China, France, Germany, Greenland, Finland, Canada, Austria, Romania, Norway, Brazil,  and the United States.

Recently, a different mechanism of formation of lanthanites was discovered: Lanthanites also can form via a highly hydrated, nanoparticulate and poorly ordered carbonate precursor.  The lifetime of this rare-earth bearing precursor as well as the kinetics of crystallization of the various REE-lanthanites are dependent on the specific trivalent rare-earth ion involved in the reaction. The times needed for lanthanites to fully crystallize increase linearly with the ionic potential of the trivalent rare-earth ion (La3+, Ce3+, Pr3+, Nd3+) present in their structure. The differences in these ion sizes and ionic potential as well as differences in dehydration energy of the trivalent rare-earth ions control the lifetime of the poorly ordered precursor and thus also the crystallization kinetics of the lanthanites. Furthermore, they also affect the structural characteristics (e.g. unit-cell dimensions and standard shape) of the crystals.

References

Other sources
Webmineral data
Mindat with location data
RRUFF Project

Further reading
Miyawaki R, Matsubara S, Yokoyama K, Iwano S, Hamasaki K, Yukinori I (2003) Kozoite-(La), La(CO3)(OH), a new mineral from Mitsukoshi, Hizen-cho, Saga Prefecture, Japan. Journal of Mineralogical and Petrological Sciences 98, 137–141.
Miyawaki, R., Matsubara, S., Yokoyama, K., Takeuchi, K., Terada, Y., & Nakai, I. (2000). Kozoite-(Nd), Nd (CO3)(OH), a new mineral in an alkali olivine basalt from Hizen-cho, Saga Prefecture, Japan. American Mineralogist, 85(7-8), 1076–1081.
SHEARD, E.R., WILLIAMS-JONES, A.E., HEILIGMANN, M., PEDERSON, C. AND TRUEMAN, D.L. (2012) Controls on the concentration of zirconium, niobium, and the rare earth elements in the Thor Lake rare metal deposit, Northwest Territories, Canada. Economic Geology, 107(1), 81-104.
Nordrum, F. S. (2007): Nyfunn av mineraler i Norge 2006–2007. STEIN 34 (2), 14–26.
Husdal, T. (2009): Ancylittmineraler i Norge. Norsk Bergverksmuseum Skrift 41, 33 - 42.
Larsen, A. O. (1994): Drusemineraler fra Solumsåsen pukkverk, Holmestrand. STEIN 21 (2), 136–141. 
Minerals of Georgia: Their properties and occurrences. Robert Cook GGWRD Bull 92.
American Mineralogist: 38: 1169-1183*New Data on Minerals (2004): 39: 50–64.
Jensen (1978) Minerals of New York State.*Dana 6: 767; Palache, C., Berman, H., & Frondel, C. (1951), The System of Mineralogy of James Dwight Dana and Edward Salisbury Dana, Yale University 1837–1892, Volume II: 242.*Rocks & Minerals: 6: 26; Rocks & Minerals: 10: 33–36, 58.
Handbook of Mineralogy - Anthony, Bideaux, Bladh, Nichols; Hess, F. L. 1908. Minerals of the rare-earth metals at Baringer Hill, Llano County, Texas. U.S. Geological Survey Bulletin 340. 286–294.
Schooner, Richard. (1958): The Mineralogy of the Portland-East Hampton-Middletown-Haddam Area in Connecticut (With a few notes on Glastonbury and Marlborough).

Lanthanide minerals
Carbonate minerals
Orthorhombic minerals
Minerals in space group 56